Sinomicrobium oceani is a bacterium from the genus of Sinomicrobium which has been isolated from marine sediments from the Nansha Islands.

References

Flavobacteria
Bacteria described in 2013